A Very Very Very Dark Matter is a 2018 play by Martin McDonagh.

Notable productions 
It premiered at the Bridge Theatre in London from 19 October (previews from 12 October) to 6 January 2019. The production starred:

 Jim Broadbent as Hans Christian Andersen
 Johnetta Eula’Mae Ackles as Marjory
 Phil Daniels as Charles Dickens
 Elizabeth Berrington as Catherine Dickens
 Lee Knight as Edvard
 Ryan Pope as Dirk

It was directed by Matthew Dunster, designed by Anna Fleischle with lighting by Phillip Gladwell, sound by George Dennis and video by Finn Ross.

References 

2018 plays
Plays set in Denmark
Hans Christian Andersen
Plays by Martin McDonagh